Centriscoidea is a superfamily of the suborder Aulostomoidei, part of the order which includes the sea horses, piperfishes and dragonets, the Syngnathiformes. They are characterised by having the 5-6 anterior vertebrae being elongated and the pelvic fin has a single spine and four rays.

Families
There are currently three families classified under the Centriscoidea, although some authorities subsume the Macropamphosidae into the Centriscidae. The families currently classified in this superfamily are:

 Macroramphosidae (snipefish)
 Centriscidae (shrimpfish)
 Dactylopteridae (flying gurnards)

References

Syngnathiformes